Navajo Technical University (NTU) is a public tribal land-grant university in Crownpoint, New Mexico, with sites in the towns of Chinle, Arizona and Teec Nos Pos, Arizona. NTU is the largest tribal college in the country and is a 1994 land grant university. It has been accredited by the Higher Learning Commission since 2005 and is home to the first accredited veterinary technician program on an Indian reservation.

History

Navajo Technical University was chartered by the Navajo Nation in 1979 as the Navajo Skill Center and sought to meet the needs of its unemployed population. After expanding the school's mission, the Center was renamed Crownpoint Institute of Technology in 1985. The institution was designated a land-grant college in 1994 alongside 31 other tribal colleges. In 2006, the Navajo Nation Council approved changing its name to Navajo Technical College. The institution's name was changed once more in 2013 to its current name, Navajo Technical University.

Services
NTU provides support services including:
 student and faculty housing (Crownpoint site only) 
 a childcare center 
 computer technologies 
 comprehensive library services

Academics
NTU offers a variety of academic programs, including certificates, associate degrees, bachelor's degree, and a Master of Arts degree in Diné Studies. As of 2011, it is one of seven tribal colleges in the U.S. to offer a degree related to tribal administration.

Partnerships
NTU is a member of the American Indian Higher Education Consortium (AIHEC), a community of tribally- and federally-chartered institutions. NTU was created in response to the higher education needs of American Indians. It generally serves geographically isolated populations that have no other means of accessing education beyond the high school level.

References

External links
 Official website

Public universities and colleges in New Mexico
Education in Albuquerque, New Mexico
Buildings and structures in Albuquerque, New Mexico
American Indian Higher Education Consortium
Technical schools
USCAA member institutions
Educational institutions established in 1979
1979 establishments in New Mexico
Education on the Navajo Nation